Lido Tomasi (born 17 November 1955) is an Italian ski jumper. He competed at the 1976 Winter Olympics, the 1980 Winter Olympics and the 1984 Winter Olympics.

References

External links
 

1955 births
Living people
Italian male ski jumpers
Olympic ski jumpers of Italy
Ski jumpers at the 1976 Winter Olympics
Ski jumpers at the 1980 Winter Olympics
Ski jumpers at the 1984 Winter Olympics
Sportspeople from the Province of Brescia